Oenoe, also written Oinoi or Oene, may refer to:

Places
Oenoe (Attica), a town of ancient Attica
Oenoe (Argolis), a town of ancient Argolis, Greece
Oenoe (Corinthia), a fort of ancient Corinthia, Greece
Oenoe (Elis), a town of ancient Elis, Greece
Oenoe (Icaria), an ancient city on the island of Icaria, Greece
Oenoe (Locris), a city of ancient Locris, Greece
Oenoe (Marathon), a town of ancient Attica, near Marathon
Oinoi, Greece, a village in the municipality of Mandra-Eidyllia, West Attica, Greece
Oinoi, Boeotia, a village in the municipality of Tanagra, Greece
Oinoi, Kastoria, a village in the municipality of Kastoria, Greece
Oinoi, Kozani, part of the city of Kozani, Greece
Oenoe, the ancient Greek name of Ünye, Turkey
Oenoe, the ancient name of Sikinos, an island of Greece

Other uses
Battle of Oenoe, a 460 battle in Attica in the First Peloponnesian War
Oenoe (mythology), several characters in Greek mythology
Oenoe (moth), a genus of moths

See also
Oene, Gelderland, a village in Gelderland, The Netherlands